The first series of Česko Slovensko má talent began on 29 August 2010 and ended on 28 November 2010. It was won by Acrobalance duo DeaMan. The first five shows concerned the audition stages of the competition and the final eight shows aired the live semi-finals and final. The show was hosted by Martin "Pyco" Rasuch and Jakub Prachař. The judges were Jan Kraus, Lucie Bílá and Jaro Slávik.

Castings
Producers castings

Jury castings

Semi-final summary
The "Order" columns lists the order of appearance each act made for every episode.

Semi-final 1

Semi-final 2

Semi-final 3

Semi-final 4

Semi-final 5

Semi-final 6

Semi-final 7

Grand final summary
The "Order" columns lists the order of appearance each act made for every episode.

Grand final

External links
Česko Slovensko má talent TV Joj
 Česko Slovensko má talent TV Prima

2010 Slovak television seasons